Helen Marie Frost (born March 4, 1949) is an American writer and poet. She is best known for the young-adult novel Keesha's House, which was a Michael L. Printz Award honor book in 2004.

Frost was born in South Dakota, the fifth child in a family of ten children. She studied elementary education at Syracuse University. Frost graduated from Syracuse University with a degree in elementary education and a concentration in English, with Philip Booth and W. D. Snodgrass among her teachers. She received her master's degree in English from Indiana University in 1994. Since then, she has become the author of nine novels-in-poems and six picture books. Frost loves to travel. She has traveled to many countries, including Canada, Mexico, Guatemala, Scotland, England, Ireland, China, Japan, Denmark, Germany, and Myanmar, where she was part of a 2016 delegation from Fort Wayne to establish a Friendship City with Mawlamyine. Frost also enjoys hiking, swimming, beadwork, and gardening (especially to welcome birds and monarch butterflies). Since 1991, she has lived in Fort Wayne, Indiana. Before that she moved frequently,  living in Scotland, Vermont, Colorado, Alaska, Oregon, and California. In Scotland, she taught at Kilquhanity House School, a progressive boarding school in the tradition of Summerhill. In Alaska, she taught for three years in a one-teacher school in Telida, an Athabascan community of about 25 people, and later taught fifth grade in Ketchikan.

Frost is married to Chad Thompson, a linguist and musician, and they live in Fort Wayne, Indiana. They have two sons, Lloyd and Glen.

Throughout her career, writing and teaching have been inter-woven threads. She has published poetry, children's books, anthologies, and a play, as well as a book about teaching writing. She has taught writing at all levels, from pre-school through university and adult education. Frost has also received an Indiana Author Award, a Boston Public Library Literary Lights for Children award, and a National Endowment for the Arts Literature Fellowship in Poetry.

Books
 Keesha's House, Frances Foster Books, 01/08/2003
 Spinning Through the Universe, Frances Foster Books, 2004
 The Braid, Frances Foster Books, 10/03/2006
 Diamond Willow, Frances Foster Books, 04/1/2008
 Monarch and Milkweed, Atheneum, 2008
 Crossing Stones, Frances Foster Books, 09/29/2009
 Hidden, Frances Foster Books, 2011
 Step Gently Out, Candlewick, 2012
 Salt: A Story of Friendship in a Time of War, Farrar, Straus and Giroux, 12/01/2013
Room 214, Original hardcover title: Spinning Through the Universe, Square Fish Books, 2014
Applesauce Weather, Candlewick, 08/9/2016
Wake Up!, Candlewick, 04/4/2017
When My Sister Started Kissing, Margaret Ferguson Books/FSG/Macmillan, 2017
Sweep Up the Sun, Candlewick, 02/13/2018
Among a Thousand Fireflies, Candlewick, 04/9/2019
Hello, I’m Here, Candlewick, 04/20/2019
 All He Knew, Farrar, Straus and Giroux, 08/11/2020

Awards
Mark Twain award 2013 for Hidden
https://thelibrary.org/teens/booklists/tpl_nominees_list.cfm?awardid=7&listid=742
 Honor Book, Michael L. Printz Award for Keesha's Story (2004)
Indiana Authors Award (2011)

References

 Sources

External links
 

1949 births
21st-century American novelists
American women novelists
American writers of young adult literature
Living people
Place of birth missing (living people)
21st-century American women writers
Women writers of young adult literature